Gaius Atilius Regulus may refer to:
 Gaius Atilius Regulus (consul 257 BC)
 Gaius Atilius Regulus (consul 225 BC)